Deliyak or Deleyak or Deliyek may refer to:
 Deliyak, Landeh